Najmeddin Huseyn oghlu Sadikov (born May 24, 1956) is an Azerbaijani Colonel General who served as the incumbent Chief of the General Staff of Azerbaijani Armed Forces and the First Deputy Minister of Defense of Azerbaijan. He was appointed to both positions on November 2, 1993 by President of Azerbaijan Heydar Aliyev. It was announced that he was not serving as the chief of staff on 28 January 2021, and Karim Valiyev took his position on 23 July of that year.

Personal life
Sadikov was born in the city of Derbent to an ethnic Azeri family. He has a brother who died in the 1980s. After the outbreak of hostilities in 1991, he moved to Azerbaijan with his family. He is married and has three children.  Sadikov’s nephew, Ramil Asgarov, is another senior military official, who was major general until June 2020.

Soviet Armed Forces 
He joined the Soviet Armed Forces in 1975. He graduated from the Baku Higher Combined Arms Command School in 1979 and earned the “Gold medal”. He served as a platoon commander, a company commander, a battalion commander and regiment deputy commander in the Soviet Army from 1979 to 1992. He graduated from the Frunze Military Academy in Moscow in 1988, and completed the Higher Officer Courses "Vystrel" ("Shot") named after Marshal of the Soviet Union Boris Shaposhnikov in 1991.

Azerbaijani Armed Forces 
He joined the Azerbaijani Army on 1 February 1992. After its creation on 3 March 1992, Sadikov became the first commander of the 1st Army Corps. He led the corps during the failed Battle of Kalbajar. On 2 November 1993, he was appointed as Chief of the General Staff. Up until his dismissal, he was the longest serving chief of defence in the Commonwealth of Independent States. Sadikov was a member of the Commission on National Security Policies which prepares and develops documents on national security concepts, foreign policy strategies and military doctrines of Azerbaijan Republic. According to the Presidential Decree No. 858 from June 24, 2005 he was promoted to the rank of Colonel General.

Criticisms 
His critics allege that Sadikov, who despite being ethnically Azeri, does not know the Azerbaijani language because he was born in Dagestan, and therefore all documents on his desk are first translated from Azerbaijani into Russian by special services. In early October 2020, Azeri press circles spread rumors on the arrest of Sadikov, who was accused of treason. Investigators claimed that he was recruited by the Russian special services through a nephew in Russia. Later, this information was refuted, and the media reported that Sadikov was sidelined at the beginning of the 2020 Nagorno-Karabakh war due to his dissatisfaction with the widespread presence of the Turkish Armed Forces in the administrative level of the Azerbaijani military.

He has also been accused of having a good relationship with Armenian officials, with many pointing to a photo of Sadikov and Armenian general Mikael Harutyunyan laughing at a NATO summit in 2008 as a reason to be distrustful of Sadikov.

Protests against him 
During the July 2020 Azerbaijani protests, the protesters chanted slogans "Najmaddin resign". The demonstrators demanded his resignation due to him being suspected of acting as a sleeper agent for the Armenian Army, in which he leaked the coordinates of General Polad Hashimov during mini skirmishes that month. Sadigov served as a pallbearer at his funeral.

Dismissal and missing
On 28 January 2021, the Azerbaijani Defense Ministry confirmed the dismissal of Sadikov, saying that he no longer serves in the Azerbaijani army. It was earlier reported that he had serious health problems and underwent open-heart surgery in Moscow. Later, his name was removed from the official website of the ministry.

During Azerbaijan's military offensive against Armenia and Nagorno-Karabakh Najmeddin Sadikov disappeared and hasn't been seen since. Agil Abbas, deputy of the National Assembly of Azerbaijan, believes that Sadikov is under house arrest. Official information has not been published. Fuad Shahbaz, a Baku-based political and military analyst, said, that "The state wants a quiet solution to this and for people to forget about it."

Awards 
Sadikov has received numerous awards, among them:

Veten Ughrunda Medal (2003) 
Vetene Xidmete Gore Order 3rd degree (2007)
Herbi Xidmete Gore Medal (2009)
Azerbaijani Army 100th anniversary medal (2018)

See also
Azerbaijani Army
Ministers of Defense of Azerbaijan Republic
Safar Abiyev

References

Azerbaijani generals
Azerbaijani military personnel of the Nagorno-Karabakh War
Azerbaijani people of Dagestani descent
Ministers of Defense of Azerbaijan
Living people
1956 births
People from Derbent
Chiefs of General Staff of Azerbaijani Armed Forces
Recipients of the Azerbaijan Democratic Republic 100th anniversary medal